Plymouth is an unincorporated community in Lyon County, Kansas, United States.  It is located approximately 5 miles west of the city of Emporia along Rd B2.

History
Plymouth was laid out in 1858. The first school class was taught in 1862, the first school house was built in 1864. The present old school house was built in 1882.

Plymouth was a station and shipping point on the Atchison, Topeka and Santa Fe Railway.

A post office was opened in Plymouth in 1858, and remained in operation until it was discontinued in 1930.

Education
The community is served by Emporia USD 253 public school district.

References

Further reading

External links
 Lyon County maps: Current, Historic, KDOT

Unincorporated communities in Lyon County, Kansas
Unincorporated communities in Kansas